"Don't Give Candy to a Stranger" is a song co-written and recorded by American country music artist Larry Boone. It was released in May 1988 as the seventh single from his self-titled debut album. The song peaked at number 10 on the Billboard Hot Country Singles chart.  Boone wrote the song, along with Dave Gibson and Jimbeau Hinson.

Charts

Weekly charts

Year-end charts

References

1988 singles
Larry Boone songs
Mercury Records singles
Songs written by Larry Boone
Song recordings produced by Ray Baker (music producer)
Songs written by Jimbeau Hinson
Songs written by Dave Gibson (American songwriter)
1988 songs